Peter Celestine Elampassery OFM, Cap. (28 June 1938 – 27 May 2015) was the 2nd Bishop of the Roman Catholic Diocese of Jammu–Srinagar.

Early life 
Peter was born on 28 June 1938, in Muttuchira, Kerala, India. After completing matriculation he joined the Capuchins and took his vows in 1963.

Priesthood 
Peter was ordained to the priesthood on 3 October 1966 in Order of Friars Minor Capuchin congregation. He worked in the Agra mission of the Capuchins for some time.  He was appointed Superior of the Capuchins in Northern India in 1980. He was sent to Jammu-Srinagar Mission as the Pro-Prefect Apostolic.  He was appointed first Vicar of the Diocese when it was created in 1986. He was transferred to Assam-Meghalaya Mission as the Provincial Delegate in 1997.

Episcopate 
Elampassery was appointed 2nd Bishop of the Roman Catholic Diocese of Jammu–Srinagar, India, on 3 April 1998. His Episcopal Ordination was on 6 September 1998 and he retired in 2014. He succeeded Bishop Hippolytus Anthony Kunnkunal OFM, Cap. He suffered a stroke in July 2012. He resigned in 2013 due to deteriorating health. His resignation was accepted by the Holy See on  3 December 2014.

Education 
Peter Celestine received his  Doctorate in Missiology from Pontifical Gregorian University, Rome, Italy in 1978.

Death 
He died on 27 May 2015 at Assisi Ashram, Bharananganam, Kerala after prolonged illness and massive heart attack. He was 77.

Books 
Early Capuchin Mission in India

Award 
Dr. Peter Celestine Elampassery OFM, Cap Received Gandhi Peace Award from Government of Jammu and Kashmir for the formation of peace clubs in schools, cross-border dialogue, and inter-religious meets.

See also 
List of Catholic bishops of India

References

External links

1938 births
2015 deaths
21st-century Roman Catholic bishops in India
Pontifical Gregorian University alumni
Christian clergy from Kottayam

People from Kerala
20th-century Roman Catholic bishops in India
Capuchin bishops